TDK Electronics AG is a German manufacturer of electronic components, modules and systems. It is a subsidiary of Japan-based TDK Corporation.

Company history

The company was created as EPCOS AG in 1999 from Siemens Matsushita Components, which was a joint venture of Siemens and Matsushita in 1989. The stock opened on 15 October 1999 at the same time in Frankfurt and New York City, with Siemens and Matsushita holding interests of 12.5% each. In 2006 Siemens sold its shares of EPCOS. In October 2006 Matsushita also sold its holdings. TDK Corporation agreed to acquire a controlling stake in the company on 31 July 2008.
After complete acquisition of EPCOS by TDK on October 1, 2009, the TDK-EPC cooperation, with about 36,000 employees worldwide, was founded in Japan.

Products

TDK Electronics' portfolio includes capacitors, ceramic components, EMC filters, inductors, non-linear resistors, surge arresters and ferrites.

Locations 
In Germany TDK Electronics has production locations in Heidenheim an der Brenz (inductors and capacitors) and Berlin (sensors). Worldwide TDK Electronics operates production facilities in Brazil (Gravatai), Spain (Málaga), India (Bawal, Nashik, Kalyani), Hungary (Szombathely), Austria (Deutschlandsberg), United States (Dallas), Czech Republic (Šumperk), Malaysia, Singapore, Indonesia and China.

References

External links
Official website

Electronics companies of Germany
Manufacturing companies based in Munich
Siemens
TDK
Electronics companies established in 1999
Capacitor manufacturers
German companies established in 1999
2008 mergers and acquisitions